An avian veterinarian is a veterinarian who specializes in treating birds. All veterinarians, upon first qualification from a certified veterinary college, may treat any species. Additional training is required for qualification to become a recognized specialist in the care of birds. 

In the United States, a veterinarian can specialize in avian medicine and surgery via post-graduate training through the American Board of Veterinary Practitioners and become a Diplomate of the American Board of Veterinary Practitioners (Avian Practice). Avian veterinarians can become members of the Association of Avian Veterinarians for additional education opportunities including a journal and an annual conference. 

In Europe, veterinarians become recognized as avian specialists by qualifying as a Diplomate of the European College of Zoological Medicine (Avian), and in Australia and New Zealand by qualifying as a Member or Fellow of the Australian and New Zealand College of Veterinary Scientists.

See also 

Veterinary specialties
Well-bird exam

References

External links 

American Board of Veterinary Practitioners
Association of Avian Veterinarians 
European Association of Avian Veterinarians
Journal of Avian Medicine and Surgery

Animal care occupations
Birds and humans
Poultry diseases
Veterinary professions
Bird health